The greater pipefish (Syngnathus acus) is a pipefish of the family Syngnathidae. It is a seawater fish and the type species of the genus Syngnathus.

Etymology
The genus name Syngnathus derives from the Greek, syn, symphysis meaning  grown together and gnathos meaning jaw. The Latin species name acus means needle.

Description

The greater pipefish has a long segmented armoured body, angular in cross section and stretching up 45 cm long with its stiff appearance. It ranges a color brown to green in with broad alternating light and dark hue along it. Its customized by a long snout with mouth on end and a slight hump on the top of the body just behind the eyes.

The fish is generally 33 cm to 35 cm in length with a reported maximum length of 47 cm.  They are almost square in each segment of the body, and known to feel rigid when handled. The greater pipefish has distinctive body rings which are a sandy brown with darker bars covering his body in between.

Anatomy
The anatomy of fish vary through the sex. The top third of the females belly is deep (when egg bound), twice the breadth of the lower two thirds below the vent. The male is the "tailing" with the twin folds below the vent. The folds of the skin make the middle third and during the "brooding" of the young they swell in size until the young are released from the pouch (at a size of 22 mm to 35 mm).

Biology
These fishes feed on live mysids and small prawns. They are ovoviviparous and reproduce usually three times each year. A few females deposit partial clutches under the tail into the male's brood pouch, that may contain up to 400 eggs.

Distribution 
The greater pipefish is found all around the British Isles and is regularly found in the Mediterranean Sea.

Habitat
These fishes are common on southerly and westerly coasts in a variety of habitats, often amongst seaweeds and seagrass.

Syngnathus temminckii
The southern African species Syngnathus temminckii (Kaup, 1856) was until recently synonymised with S. acus. However, morphological data clearly show that it is distinct, and genetic data indicate that it is not even the sister taxon of S. acus, but of another southern African species, the river pipefish S. watermeyeri.

Gallery

Bibliography 
 Bent J. Muus, Jørgen G. Nielsen: Die Meeresfische Europas. In Nordsee, Ostsee und Atlantik. Franckh-Kosmos Verlag, 
 Dawson, C.E., 1986. Syngnathidae. p. 628-639. In P.J.P. Whitehead, M.-L. Bauchot, J.-C. Hureau, J. Nielsen and E. Tortonese (eds.) Fishes of the North-eastern Atlantic and the Mediterranean. Volume 2. Unesco, Paris. 
 Rudie H. Kuiter: Seepferdchen: Seenadeln, Fetzenfische und ihre Verwandten. Ulmer (Eugen), 2001,

References

 Greater Pipefish Syngnathus acus - Jim Hall

External links

Syngnathus acus on Marine Life Encyclopedia
Greater pipefish on Marine Life Information Network
The greater pipefish in Aquaria
 Photo from Denmark Aquarium
 

greater pipefish
Fish of the East Atlantic
Fish of the Adriatic Sea
Fish of the North Sea
Fish of the Black Sea
Fish of the Mediterranean Sea
Marine fish of Europe
Marine fauna of Africa
greater pipefish
greater pipefish